Vahdatabad may refer to:
 Vahdatabad, Bushehr
 Vahdatabad, Fars
 Vahdatabad, Ilam
 Vahdatabad, Kerman
 Vahdatabad, Sirjan, Kerman Province
 Vahdatabad, Kohgiluyeh and Boyer-Ahmad
 Vahdatabad-e Mugarmun, Kohgiluyeh and Boyer-Ahmad Province